is a 2014 Japanese science fiction anime television series based on Sunrise's long-running Gundam franchise, and a sequel to the 2013 series Gundam Build Fighters. Like its predecessor, and in contrast to other Gundam series, Gundam Build Fighters Try features a tournament-based storyline where Gunpla models are built, customized, and battled.

The series is directed by Shinya Watada and written by Yousuke Kuroda, who wrote the first series. Character designs were done by both Kenichi Ohnuki and Suzuhito Yasuda. The series was officially unveiled by Bandai on May 15, 2014, and began airing on TV Tokyo in Japan while streaming on YouTube in limited areas internationally on October 8, 2014. A novel spinoff is currently running in Hobby Japan starting in December 2014.

Story

Seven years after the events of Gundam Build Fighters, the rules of Gunpla have been renewed, and the sport becomes even more popular. However, one academy is left behind in this change, and that was Seiho Academy, which Sei Iori once attended.

Gunpla Battle

Shortly after the Arista that produces Plavsky particles is destroyed in the final episode of the previous season, Plavsky Particle System Engineering (PPSE) is acquired by Yajima Trading while American scientist and Gunpla fighter Nils Nielsen and his girlfriend Caroline Yajima rediscover Plavsky particles aboard the International Space Station. With new Plavsky particles produced, the sport of Gunpla Battle continues worldwide.

In Gundam Build Fighters Try, the one-on-one battle format is replaced by battles between teams of three Gunpla fighters and is divided into two categories: one for players under 19 years old and one for older players.

New rules have been added to Gunpla battle:

Non-mobile suit support units such as Core Boosters count as one Gunpla unit.
Mobile suits that combine such as the ZZ Gundam or Victory Gundam count as one unit, but must be controlled by only one person when separated into multiple units.
Teams may use only one mobile armor in battle, with all three members piloting it.
Teams can change Gunpla before each match; changing Gunpla during a match is forbidden.
Each match has a 15-minute time limit.
If both teams have the same number of Gunpla left after the time limit expires, the match is declared a draw; each team will select a representative for a one-on-one battle to determine a winner.

In addition, damage levels can now be set on Gunpla Battles. Damage Level C, which inflicts simulated but no physical damage on the Gunpla, is often used in practice rounds. Damage Level B results in simulated damage, but disconnected joints that can easily be fixed. For Damage Level A, Gunpla destroyed in combat are severely damaged physically and will need either replacement parts or a whole new unit altogether.

Production

Gundam Build Fighters Try was first announced by Sunrise on May 15, 2014, as a sequel to Gundam Build Fighters. The new series, which was stated for an October 2014 release, reunited the production staff from the previous series.

In September 2014, Masashi Hirose was hospitalized for an unspecified illness after having recorded his lines as Mr. Ral for the first four episodes. A month later, he was replaced by Katsuhisa Hōki for the rest of the series.

Sunrise would release the series in North American on home video (via Right Stuf) in 2016.

A TV special sequel, titled  aired on August 21, 2016.

Music

Both songs debuted in episode 14.

The insert song in Gundam Build Fighters Try: Island Wars is "The Last One" by Back-On, while the ending theme is "Roots of Happiness" by Elizabeth Elias.

References

External links
 
 (Island Wars) 
 (Battlogue) 
 at TV Tokyo 
 
 

2014 anime television series debuts
2014 Japanese television series debuts
2016 anime
Gundam anime and manga
Fictional martial sports in anime and manga
Metafictional television series
Sunrise (company)
TV Tokyo original programming